The 2014 Horizon League Men’s Basketball Tournament began on March 4 and ended with the championship game on Tuesday March 11. First round games were played on the home court of the higher-seeded team. The second round and semifinals were hosted by the No. 1 seed Green Bay, while the highest remaining seed hosted the championship game.  All Horizon League schools participated in the tournament.  Teams were seeded by 2013–14 Horizon League season record, with a tiebreaker system to seed teams with identical conference records, the top two teams received a bye to the semifinals.

Seeds

Schedule
The tournament schedule is listed in the following table.

Bracket

First round games at campus sites of higher seeds
Second round and semifinals hosted by No. 1 seed Green Bay
Championship game hosted by highest remaining seed

References

Tournament
Horizon League men's basketball tournament
Horizon League men's basketball tournament
Horizon League men's basketball tournament